Configurations of elements 109 and above are not available. Predictions from reliable sources have been used for these elements.
 Grayed out electron numbers indicate subshells that are filled to their maximum.
 The bracketed noble gas symbols on the left represent the inner configurations that are the same in each period. Written out these are:
 He, 2, helium : 1s2
 Ne, 10, neon : 1s2 2s2 2p6
 Ar, 18, argon : 1s2 2s2 2p6 3s2 3p6
 Kr, 36, krypton : 1s2 2s2 2p6 3s2 3p6 4s2 3d10 4p6
 Xe, 54, xenon : 1s2 2s2 2p6 3s2 3p6 4s2 3d10 4p6 5s2 4d10 5p6
 Rn, 86, radon : 1s2 2s2 2p6 3s2 3p6 4s2 3d10 4p6 5s2 4d10 5p6 6s2 4f14 5d10 6p6
 Og, 118, oganesson : 1s2 2s2 2p6 3s2 3p6 4s2 3d10 4p6 5s2 4d10 5p6 6s2 4f14 5d10 6p6 7s2 5f14 6d10 7p6
 Note that these electron configurations are given for neutral atoms in the gas phase, which are not the same as the electron configurations for the same atoms in chemical environments. In many cases, multiple configurations are within a small range of energies and the small irregularities that arise in the d- and f-blocks are quite irrelevant chemically. The construction of the periodic table ignores these irregularities and is based on ideal electron configurations.
 Note the non-linear shell ordering, which comes about due to the different energies of smaller and larger shells.

References 
See list of sources at Electron configurations of the elements (data page).

Electron configurations